Walter William Webb (1885–1956) was a rugby league footballer in the Australian competition the New South Wales Rugby League.

Biography

Wally Webb played for the Eastern Suburbs club in the 1909 season but it better remembered as a leading administrator of the club. He also represented New South Wales in 1909.

The father-in-law of Eastern suburbs legend Ray Stehr, Wally Webb was one of that club's earliest secretaries. Webb was awarded life membership of the Eastern Suburbs Roosters club and was president of the club for many years.

He was also a noted Horse trainer, winning the Ascot Cup with Greyfoot in 1928.

Wally Webb was team manager of the 1933/34 Kangaroos, working closely with Harry Sunderland.

Death

He died at Kingsford, New South Wales on New Year's Eve 1956.

References

 The Encyclopedia Of Rugby League Players; Alan Whiticker & Glen Hudson
 History Of The New South Wales Rugby League; Steve Haddan

Australian rugby league players
Sydney Roosters players
1885 births
1956 deaths
Rugby league players from New South Wales